The 1989 NCAA Division I women's basketball tournament began on March 15 and ended on April 2. The tournament expanded from 40 to 48 teams. The Final Four consisted of Auburn, Louisiana Tech, Tennessee, and Maryland, with Tennessee winning its second title with a 76-60 victory over Auburn.  Tennessee's Bridgette Gordon was named the Most Outstanding Player of the tournament.

Records
Auburn has only six turnovers in the National Semi-final game against Louisiana Tech, the fewest turnovers recorded in a Final Four game.

Bridgette Gordon scored 17 points from the free throw line in the East Regional final between Tennessee and Long Beach state, the most ever scored in an NCAA tournament game.

Maryland had 25 steals in a game against Stephen F. Austin in the West Regional semifinal, the most in an NCAA tournament game, since the statistic has been recorded (starting in 1988).

Jennifer Azzi hit nine of eleven three point attempts over the course of the tournament, the best percentage ever recorded in a tournament game (minimum- 1.5 made per game)

Stanford hit 22 of 33 three point attempts over the course of the tournament, the best percentage ever recorded in a tournament game (minimum - three games)

Qualifying teams – automatic
Forty-eight teams were selected to participate in the 1989 NCAA Tournament. Nineteen conferences were eligible for an automatic bid to the 1989 NCAA tournament.

Qualifying teams – at-large
Twenty-nine additional teams were selected to complete the forty-eight invitations.

Bids by conference
Nineteen conferences earned an automatic bid.  In seven cases, the automatic bid was the only representative from the conference. Two conferences, Southland and American South sent a single representative as an at-large team. One team earned an at-large bid as an Independent Twenty-six additional at-large teams were selected from ten of the conferences.

First and second rounds
In 1989, the field expanded to 48 teams. The teams were seeded, and assigned to four geographic regions, with seeds 1-12 in each region. In Round 1, seeds 8 and 9 faced each other for the opportunity to face the 1 seed in the second round, seeds 7 and 10 played for the opportunity to face the 2 seed, seeds 5 and 12 played for the opportunity to face the 4 seed, and seeds 6 and 11 played for the opportunity to face the 3 seed. In the first two rounds, the higher seed was given the opportunity to host the first-round game. In most cases, the higher seed accepted the opportunity. The exceptions:

 Fifth seeded Purdue played fourth seeded LSU at Purdue
 Tenth seeded Montana played seventh seeded Cal St. Fullerton at Montana
 Ninth seeded Oklahoma State played eighth seeded Miami(FL) at Oklahoma State
 Seventh seeded  Vanderbilt played tenth seeded St. Joseph's at St. Joseph's
 Ninth seeded Bowling Green played  eighth seeded Cincinnati at Bowling Green

Because Purdue was also a first round venue, there are only 31 rather than 32 first and second round venues

The following table lists the region, host school, venue and the thirty-one first and second round locations:

Regionals and  Final Four

The regionals, named for the general  location, were held from March 23 to March 25 at these sites:

 East Regional  E.A. Diddle Arena, Bowling Green, Kentucky (Host: Western Kentucky University)
 Mideast Regional   Memorial Coliseum (Beard–Eaves–Memorial  Coliseum), Auburn, Alabama (Host:  Auburn University)
 Midwest Regional  Thomas Assembly Center, Ruston, Louisiana (Host: Louisiana Tech University)
 West Regional  Frank Erwin Center, Austin, Texas (Host: University of Texas)

Each regional winner advanced to the  Final Four, held March 31 and April 2 in Tacoma, Washington  at the Tacoma Dome, co-hosted by Seattle University & University of Washington.

Bids by state

The forty-eight teams came from thirty-one states.
Pennsylvania and Tennessee had the most teams with four each.  Nineteen states did not have any teams receiving bids.

Brackets
First and second-round games played at higher seed except where noted.

Mideast regional – Auburn, AL (Beard–Eaves–Memorial Coliseum)

Midwest regional – Ruston, LA (Thomas Assembly Center)

East regional – Bowling Green, KY (E.A. Diddle Arena)

West regional – Austin, Texas (Frank Erwin Center)

Final Four – Tacoma, WA (Tacoma Dome)

Record by  conference
Nineteen conferences had more than one  bid, or at least one win in NCAA Tournament play:

Two conferences went  0-1: High Country, and Southern Conference

All-Tournament team

 Bridgette Gordon, Tennessee
 Sheila Frost, Tennessee
 Vickie Orr, Auburn
 Venus Lacy, Louisiana Tech
 Deanna Tate, Maryland

Game officials

 Sally Bell  (semifinal)
 John Morningstar(semifinal)
 Larry Sheppard (semifinal)
 Bill Stokes (semifinal)
 June Corteau (final)
 Patty Broderick (final)

See also
 1989 NCAA Division I men's basketball tournament
 1989 NCAA Division II women's basketball tournament
 1989 NCAA Division III women's basketball tournament
 1989 NAIA women's basketball tournament

References

NCAA Division I women's basketball tournament
Tournament
NCAA Division I women's basketball tournament
NCAA Division I women's basketball tournament
NCAA Division I women's basketball tournament
Sports competitions in Tacoma, Washington
Basketball competitions in Washington (state)